Stigmella guittonae is a moth of the family Nepticulidae. It is known from Argentina.

The larvae feed on Senecio bonariensis and Jussiaea longifolia. They probably mine the leaves of their host plant.

External links
Nepticulidae and Opostegidae of the world

Nepticulidae
Moths of South America
Moths described in 1962